Boodle is a slang term for money derived from the Dutch word 'boedel' meaning property or estate.  Afrikaans inherited the word and its meaning from the Dutch, which probably accounts for its widespread use for money amongst English-speaking South Africans.

In a different context, "boodle jails" were jails in the United States, predominantly during the nineteenth century, in which a tramp or hobo could make an illicit arrangement with a law enforcement officer to stay in the jail without being an actual prisoner. For example, between 1893 and 1899, the Welsh tramp-poet W. H. Davies took advantage of this in order to pass the winter in Michigan, staying in a series of different jails. Here, with his fellow tramps, Davies would enjoy the relative comfort of "card-playing, singing, smoking, reading, relating experiences and occasionally taking exercise or going out for a walk."

References

Property